Two vessels have been named Trecothick for Barlow Trecothick:

  was launched on the Thames in 1770, probably under the same name. She first appeared at Trecothick in 1776 and was lost in 1781.
   was launched on the Thames in 1773 under another name. She first appeared at Trecothick in 1784 and was lost in 1786.

Ship names